Crimthann Coscrach ("the victorious"), son of Fedlimid Fortrén, son of Fergus Fortamail, was, according to medieval Irish legend and historical tradition, a High King of Ireland. He took power after killing his predecessor, Énna Aignech, and ruled for four or seven years, after which he was killed by Rudraige mac Sithrigi. The Lebor Gabála Érenn synchronises his reign with that of Ptolemy VIII Physcon in Egypt (145–116 BC). The chronology of Geoffrey Keating's Foras Feasa ar Éirinn dates his reign to 191–184 BC, that of the Annals of the Four Masters to 293–289 BC.

References

Legendary High Kings of Ireland
2nd-century BC legendary rulers
Regicides
Usurpers
2nd-century BC murdered monarchs